Eşref Selim Soydan (born 14 November 1941 in Beşiktaş, İstanbul) was a Turkish football player of rivals Beşiktaş J.K. and Fenerbahçe. He played as a defender.

He scored 2 goals in 22 matches for Beşiktaş between 1959–61 and scored 22 goals in 170 matches for Fenerbahçe between 1961-71. He won 4 Turkish Championship, 1 President Cup and Balkan Cup with Fenerbahçe. He competed in the men's tournament at the 1960 Summer Olympics.

He married Turkish actress Hülya Koçyiğit on 5 July 1968.

References

External links
Profile @ TFF.org

1941 births
Footballers from Istanbul
Turkey international footballers
Association football defenders
Beşiktaş J.K. footballers
Fenerbahçe S.K. footballers
Living people
Olympic footballers of Turkey
Footballers at the 1960 Summer Olympics